Cuy may refer to:

Places
 Cuy, Oise, in the Oise département
 Cuy, Yonne, in the Yonne département
 Cuy-Saint-Fiacre, in the Seine-Maritime département

Other
 Cuy, the name for the guinea pig (pl. cuyes) in the Andean regions of South America that are generally raised for meat. In the US, a large-sized breed from the Andes is often called a cuy guinea pig.
 CUY: the IATA airport code for Cue Airport in Western Australia. 
 CUY, Unión de Rugby de Cuyo in 1988 France rugby union tour of South America
 CuY, the abbreviation of Cu Y Zeolite

See also 
 Cuyahoga (disambiguation)
 Cuyo (disambiguation)